The Crown of Wilhelm II, also known as the Hohenzollern Crown (Hohenzollern Krone), is the 1888 crown made for Wilhelm II, German Emperor, in his role as King of Prussia. It was only used for heraldic purposes. A Crown of the German Empire was never made.

The crown is surmounted by a diamond-studded cross which rests on a large sapphire.  These rest on eight half-arches rising from the base that are adorned with 142 rose-cut diamonds and 18 diamonds.  Eight large pearls are mounted between the arches.

When Wilhelm abdicated in 1918 he was permitted to retain the jewels, which included the Hohenzollern crown. To protect it from theft and destruction during World War II, it was hidden in a wall in the crypt of a church. After the war it was returned to the Hohenzollern family and is now kept at the family residence of the Hohenzollern Castle.

References

See also
Prussian Crown Jewels

William II
History of Prussia
German Empire
Wilhelm II, German Emperor